Two Women in Gold is a Canadian sex comedy film, directed by Claude Fournier and released in 1970.

Plot
Fernande Turcot and Violette Lamoureux, two housewives in suburban Brossard, Quebec, who are trapped in unfulfilling marriages to husbands Yvon and Bob, and deal with their frustrations by beginning to have casual sex with the delivery or repair men who come to their houses.

Cast
Monique Mercure - Fernande Turcot
Louise Turcot - Violette Lamoureux
Marcel Sabourin - Yvon-T. Turcot
Donald Pilon - Bob Lamoureux
Vincent Fournier - Vincent Turcot
Francine Morand - Miss Cinéma
Yvon Deschamps - M. Téléphone
Donald Lautrec - M. Lait
Gilles Latulippe - M. Jolicoeur
Réal Béland - le reaconteur de blagues
Janine Sutto - Mme Lalonde
Paul Buissonneau - M. Plátre
Jean Lapointe - le sergent détective Poivrot
Paul Berval - M. Tapis
Georges Groulx - François-Xavier Lalonde
Raymond Lévesque
Michel Chartrand - judge

Production
Two Women in Gold was filmed from 24 November 1969, to 9 January 1970, on a budget of $225,000. The French version was 107 minutes and 20 seconds long while the English dub was reduced to 90 minutes and 30 seconds.

Release
The film was released in Montreal on 21 May 1970, by France Film and grossed $4 million.

Reception
Although not immediately popular with critics, the film was a significant commercial success, making at least $2 million at the box office in its initial run. Its success was part of a wave of films that reignited the commercial viability of the Cinema of Quebec, following a number of fallow years in the late 1960s. As of 2020, it was still recognized as one of the most commercially successful films in Quebec's cinematic history.

References

Works cited

External links

1970 films
1970 comedy films
Canadian sex comedy films
Films directed by Claude Fournier
Films shot in Quebec
Films set in Quebec
French-language Canadian films
1970s Canadian films